Walton Manor is a residential suburb in Oxford, England. It is north of Jericho and the Radcliffe Observatory Quarter and forms part of North Oxford. The street layout and many of the area's buildings date from the mid-19th century. It was developed on land belonging to St John's College, Oxford.

In 1975, Walton Manor was designated as a Conservation Area under the Town and Country Planning Act 1971. The conservation area is bounded by Leckford Road on the north, Woodstock Road on the east, the properties fronting Observatory Street to the south, and Kingston Road and Walton Street to the west. The main road north–south through the area is Kingston Road, which continues southwards as Walton Street towards the city centre. Walton Manor has a residents' association.

Walton Manor Farm used to be on the site of St Sepulchre's Cemetery, in Jericho, just south of the Eagle Ironworks on Walton Well Road.

See also
 Norham Manor to the east
 Walton Well

References

Sources and further reading

External links
 Walton Manor Residents' Association

Areas of Oxford
St John's College, Oxford